Cazin is a city located in Una-Sana Canton of the Federation of Bosnia and Herzegovina, an entity of Bosnia and Herzegovina. It is situated in northwest Bosnia and Herzegovina in the Bosanska Krajina region, near the border with Croatia. As of 2013, it has a population of 66,149 inhabitants.

The municipality is often also called Cazinska Krajina. The town of Cazin is located on the main road which connects Bihać and Velika Kladuša.

History

Cazin has several historic places, some dating back to the 14th century. Ostrožac castle and Radetina Tower are located in Cazin. Cazin was the city of Knin Bishop.

From 1929 to 1941, Cazin was part of the Vrbas Banovina of the Kingdom of Yugoslavia.

The Cazin uprising of 1950, an armed anti-state rebellion of peasants, occurred in Cazin and neighboring Velika Kladuša and Slunj, which were all part of Communist Yugoslavia at the time. The peasants revolted against the forced collectivization and collective farms by the Yugoslav government on the farmers of its country. Following a drought in 1949, the peasants of Yugoslavia were unable to meet unrealistic quotas set by their government and were punished. The revolt that followed the drought resulted in the killings and persecution of those who organized the uprising, but also many innocent civilians. It was the only peasant rebellion in the history of Cold War Europe.

Settlements
Aside from the urban area of Cazin, the city administrative area comprises the following settlements:

 Bajrići
 Brezova Kosa
 Bukovica
 Crnaja
 Čajići
 Čizmići
 Ćehići
 Ćoralići
 Donja Barska
 Donja Koprivna
 Donja Lučka
 Glogovac
 Gornja Barska
 Gornja Koprivna
 Gornja Lučka
 Gradina
 Hadžin Potok
 Kapići
 Kličići
 Kovačevići
 Krakača
 Krivaja
 Liđani
 Liskovac
 Ljubijankići
 Majetići
 Miostrah
 Mujakići
 Mutnik
 Osredak
 Ostrožac
 Ostrožac na Uni
 Pećigrad
 Pivnice
 Pjanići
 Podgredina
 Polje
 Ponjevići
 Prošići
 Rošići
 Rujnica
 Skokovi
 Stijena
 Šturlić
 Šturlićka Platnica
 Toromani
 Tržac
 Tržačka Platnica
 Tržačka Raštela
 Urga
 Vilenjača
 Vrelo
 Zmajevac

Demographics
According to the 2013 census, the municipality of Cazin has a population of 66,149 inhabitants. The town of Cazin has a population of 13,863.

Ethnic groups
The ethnic composition of the municipality:

Religion
The main religious group in Cazin is Islam followed by Catholic and then Orthodox.

Sports
Local football club Krajina has spent two seasons at the top tier of the Bosnia and Herzegovina football pyramid, but has mainly played at the second and third level.

Twin towns – sister cities

Cazin is twinned with:
 Develi, Turkey
 Kahramanmaraş, Turkey

Gallery

See also
Una-Sana Canton
Bosanska Krajina

References

External links

 BK Krajina
 Cazin
 Municipality of Cazin official website